The Musée alsacien (Alsatian museum) is a museum in Strasbourg in the Bas-Rhin department of France. It opened on 11 May 1907 and is dedicated to all aspects of (mostly rural) daily life in pre-industrial and early industrial Alsace. It contains over 5000 exhibits and is notable for the reconstruction of the interiors of several traditional houses. It also features a rich collection of artifacts documenting the everyday life of Alsatian Jews. 

The museum is located in several Renaissance timber framed houses on the Quai Saint-Nicolas, on the banks of the Ill river. In 1917 it was bought by the city of Strasbourg.

Another, smaller, Musée alsacien exists in the city of Haguenau, 30 kilometers north of Strasbourg.

References

Bibliography 
Le Musée Alsacien de Strasbourg, Éditions des musées de la ville de Strasbourg 2006,

External links 
 
 
 Gallery of Jewish artifacts from the museum's collection—

Jewish museums in France
Museums in Strasbourg
Alsatian Jews
FRAME Museums
Museums established in 1907
1907 establishments in France
Ethnographic museums in France